Industrial Building is a historic factory building located at Baltimore, Maryland, United States. It is a large seven story industrial-style structure built in 1912 and designed by Baltimore architect Theodore Wells Pietsch. It features an "E" plan, reinforced concrete and steel-frame construction, and large pivoted-sash windows. The front façade is characterized by a symmetrical window arrangement and a large 2-story, round-arched entranceway.  It was scheduled for conversion to housing for the elderly during the 1980s.

Industrial Building was listed on the National Register of Historic Places in 1980.

References

External links
, including photo from 1980, at Maryland Historical Trust

Buildings and structures in Baltimore
Industrial buildings and structures on the National Register of Historic Places in Baltimore
Industrial buildings completed in 1912
1912 establishments in Maryland